Visto may refer to:

Kia Visto, a Hyundai city car
Visto (rapper), American rapper and singer-songwriter
Sir Visto, British Thoroughbred racehorse and sire